Hans Henning Hansson is an Australian former professional tennis player.

Born in Sydney, to a Swedish father and French mother, Hansson was an Australian Open junior semi-finalist and competed on the professional tour in the early 1980s. He featured in the men's singles main draw of the 1982 Australian Open and lost his second round match to the 10th seeded Tim Wilkison in five sets.

References

External links
 
 

Year of birth missing (living people)
Living people
Australian male tennis players
Tennis players from Sydney
Australian people of Swedish descent
Australian people of French descent